Mitromorpha haycocki is a species of sea snail, a marine gastropod mollusk in the family Mitromorphidae.

Description
The length of the shell attains 5.5 mm, its diameter 2.5 mm.

(Original description) The small, stout shell has a short-fusiform shape. It is, white, flecked or clouded on the prominences of the sculpture with pale yellow-brown. It contains about five whorls. The protoconch is white, blunt, polished. The later whorls show, between the sutures, four subequal spiral nodulous cords with deep narrower interspaces. The cord in front of the suture is slightly more prominent than the others. On the body whorl there are about fifteen spiral cords which are crossed by about twenty axial, incised, equally spaced lines, the segments of the cords thus formed being convexly nodulous.;Toward the aperture the axial lines become feebler or obsolete. The aperture is short and rather narrow with about six spiral lirations inside the outer lip which is simple and not reflected and hardly thickened. On the columella there are two strong plaits, rather deep within the aperture. The siphonal canal is short and not very deep, with hardly any siphonal fasciole.

Distribution
This marine species occurs in the Caribbean Sea off Curaçao, Guadeloupe, French Guiana and in the Atlantic Ocean off Bermuda

References

 Espinosa J. & Ortea J. (2009) Nuevas especies cubanas del género Mitrolumna Bucquoy, Dautzenberg & Dollfus, 1883 (Mollusca: Neogastropoda: Turridae). Revista de la Academia Canaria de Ciencias 20(4): 9–14

External links
 
 

haycocki
Gastropods described in 1911